"Mon ami m'a quittée" (meaning "My Friend Left Me") is the first single from Celine Dion's album Les chemins de ma maison. It was released on 26 September 1983 in Quebec, Canada and in November 1983 in France. The song was very successful in Quebec. On 8 October 1983 it entered the singles chart and became number 1 for nine weeks. It spent twenty four weeks on the chart in total. Dion received also 2 Félix Awards the next year. "Mon ami m'a quittée" was released later as a single in France to promote Dion's first album in that country, Du soleil au cœur. A music video was made in 1984, for the Sur les chemins de ma maison TV special. Dion recorded also a German version of this song called "Mon ami, geh nicht fort". It was included as B-side on "Was bedeute ich dir" single, released in Germany in 1984.

"Mon ami m'a quittée" was also released as a single in the Netherlands in 1997 by BR Music to promote the C'est pour toi compilation. In 2005, the song became a part of Dion's official French best of album On ne change pas.

Track listings and formats
Canadian 7" single
 "Mon ami m'a quittée" – 3:00
 "Et puis un jour" – 3:12

French 7" single
 "Mon ami m'a quittée" – 3:00
 "La dodo la do" – 3:00

French 12" maxi-single
 "Mon ami m'a quittée" – 3:00
 "Ne me plaignez pas" – 3:46

1997 Dutch CD single
 "Mon ami m'a quittée" – 3:00
 "Hymne à l'amitié" – 3:59

Charts

References

1983 singles
1983 songs
Celine Dion songs
French-language songs
Song recordings produced by Eddy Marnay
Songs written by Eddy Marnay